The Coqui francolin (Campocolinus coqui) is a species of bird in the family Phasianidae.

Taxonomy 
Formerly classified in the genus Peliperdix, a 2020 study found it, the white-throated francolin (C. albogularis), and Schlegel's francolin (C. schlegelii) to together comprise a new genus Campocolinus. The International Ornithological Congress has accepted these findings.

Range
It is mainly found in Africa's southern half but is also sparsely present in the western Sahel and Ethiopia. It is believed to be the most widespread francolin in Africa.

Habitat
It mainly inhabits grasslands, steppes, savannas and dry scrubland, but also bright forest and grain fields. On high plateaus it lives up to 2,000 meters high. It is mostly resident throughout its range.

Gallery

References

Coqui francolin
Birds of Sub-Saharan Africa
Coqui francolin
Taxonomy articles created by Polbot
Taxobox binomials not recognized by IUCN